The Cross and Nelson Hall Historic District encompasses two historic buildings on the campus of Southern Arkansas University in Magnolia, Arkansas.  Cross Hall and Nelson Hall were both built in 1936 by the Public Works Administration (PWA) as dormitories for boys and girls, respectively.  They are two-story L-shaped brick buildings with Colonial Revival and Collegiate Gothic stylistic elements.  Cross Hall has since been converted into classrooms and professors' offices; Nelson Hall now houses student services and the admissions office.

The two buildings were listed as a historic district on the National Register of Historic Places in 2010.  They are the best-preserved of a small number of surviving PWA buildings in Magnolia.

See also
National Register of Historic Places listings in Columbia County, Arkansas

References

University and college buildings completed in 1936
Southern Arkansas University
Historic districts on the National Register of Historic Places in Arkansas
National Register of Historic Places in Columbia County, Arkansas
1936 establishments in Arkansas
Collegiate Gothic architecture in Arkansas
Colonial Revival architecture in Arkansas
University and college buildings on the National Register of Historic Places in Arkansas
Residential buildings on the National Register of Historic Places in Arkansas
Works Progress Administration in Arkansas
Residential buildings completed in 1936
University and college dormitories in the United States